The 2013–14 season was Falkirk's first season in the newly formed Scottish Championship and their fourth consecutive season in the second tier of Scottish football, having been relegated from the Scottish Premier League at the end of season 2009–10. Falkirk also competed in the Challenge Cup, League Cup and the Scottish Cup.

Summary

Season
Falkirk finished third in the Scottish Championship with 66 points and qualified for the Scottish Premiership play-offs, losing to Hamilton Academical in the semi-final. Falkirk also reached the quarter-final of the Challenge Cup, the third round of the League Cup and the fourth round of the Scottish Cup.

Results & fixtures

Scottish Championship

Premiership play-off

Scottish Challenge Cup

Scottish League Cup

Scottish Cup

Player statistics

|-
|colspan="12"|Players who left the club during the 2013–14 season
|-

|}

League table

Division summary

Transfers

Players in

Players out

References

Falkirk